BNG may refer to:

Organisations
 Bandai Namco Games, a video game developer based in Tokyo, subsidiary of Namco Bandai Holdings
 Bank Nederlandse Gemeenten
 British Nuclear Group
 Bahala Na Gang, a Filipino street gang with operations in the US and Philippines
 Bloque Nacionalista Galego (Galician Nationalist Bloc), a political coalition 
 Bòrd na Gàidhlig, a government body in Scotland

Cartography
 British National Grid, the Ordnance Survey National Grid reference system
 Bermuda National Grid, a kind of Transverse Mercator projection

Places
 Banning Municipal Airport (IATA airport code)
 Bingen-White Salmon (Amtrak station) (Amtrak station code), Washington, US
 Binnaguri, a small cantonment town in West Bengal, India

Other uses
 Born of the Gods (Expansion code), a trading card game expansion set
 Bob and George, a webcomic
 Border network gateway or broadband network gateway, in computing